The Lame Lover is a 1770 comedy play by the British writer Samuel Foote. Foote wrote the play while he was recovering from the amputation of his leg, following a riding accident.

The original Haymarket cast starred Foote himself as Sir Luke Limp. The cast also included Thomas Weston as Jack and Sarah Gardner as Mrs Circuit.

References

Bibliography
 Kelly, Ian. Mr Foote's Other Leg: Comedy, tragedy and murder in Georgian London. Pan Macmillan, 2012.
 Nicoll, Allardyce. A History of English Drama 1660–1900: Volume III. Cambridge University Press, 2009.
 Hogan, C.B (ed.) The London Stage, 1660–1800: Volume V. Southern Illinois University Press, 1968.

1770 plays
Comedy plays
West End plays
Plays by Samuel Foote